Alexander Kravchenko may refer to:

 Alexander Kravchenko, Russian revolutionary
 Alexander Kravchenko, Russian linguist
 Alexander Kravchenko, Russian skier
 Alexander Kravchenko, Russian poker player